House Party is a 1975 album released by the American R&B vocal group, the Temptations, on Motown Records' Gordy label.

Overview
This album is made up of vaulted songs recorded both prior to and following the sessions for A Song for You. House Party contains the final sessions recorded by falsetto Damon Harris as a member of the group, as well as the first for his replacement, Glenn Leonard.  The sessions featured a slew of producers and composers from both within and outside of the Motown stable. The completed project was overseen by Jeffrey Bowen, who produced A Song for You and the subsequent album, Wings of Love.

The Temptations were not given creative input on the final release, to which Otis Williams referred in his autobiography Temptations as a "mismatched collection of, pardon my French, shit."  Despite Williams' reservations regarding the circumstances surrounding the compilation and release of these tracks, as well as the album's perceived lack of commercial appeal, fans of the group have given House Party favorable reviews in the years since its release.

Brothers Brian and Eddie Holland, collectively two-thirds of the Holland–Dozier–Holland hit-making stable, worked on the first track and only single, "Keep Holdin' On", while Stax Records stalwart Steve Cropper contributed to three songs as producer and/or writer.  Vocal highlights include a rare lead performance by Otis Williams on his own composition, "Darling, Stand by Me (Song for My Woman)", the Richard Street-led ballad, "If I Don't Love You This Way" (a cover of a song by the Jackson 5 originally featured on their Dancing Machine album and named by the family group's lead singer Michael Jackson as one of his favourite songs); Glenn Leonard's debut in the ensemble vocal of "What You Need Most (I Do Best of All)"; and fan-favorite bass singer Melvin Franklin's lead vocals on "Ways of a Grown-Up Man."

Track listing

Personnel
Performers
 Dennis Edwards – vocals (baritone/tenor)
 Melvin Franklin – vocals (bass)
 Damon Harris – vocals (tenor/falsetto)
 Glenn Leonard – vocals (falsetto)
 Richard Street – vocals (tenor)
 Otis Williams – vocals (tenor/baritone)

Producers
 James Anthony Carmichael and Suzee Ikeda – "What You Need Most (I Do Best of All)", "Darling, Stand by Me" and "If I Don't Love You This Way"
 Steve Cropper – "World of You, Love, and Music", "Ways of a Grown-up Man" and "Johnny Porter"
 Brian Holland – "Keep Holdin' On"
 Clayton Ivey and Terry Woodford – "It's Just a Matter of Time" and "You Can't Stop a Man in Love"
 The Temptations – "What You Need Most (I Do Best of All)" and "Darling, Stand by Me"

Charts

Singles

References

External links
 House Party at Discogs
 House Party at Rate Your Music

1975 albums
The Temptations albums
Gordy Records albums
Albums produced by Jeffrey Bowen
Albums produced by Brian Holland